Mobio Besse Henri (12 October 1977 – 12 March 2020) was an Ivorian professional boxer.

Biography
On 10 June 2005, Henri won the African Boxing Confederation (ABC) light heavyweight title by beating Georges Akono. On 9 March 2007, Henri defeated Isaac Paakwesi Ankrah in the 11th round. He lost his ABC title on 24 October 2008 to Olubi Severin in the 3rd round.

References

Ivorian male boxers
1977 births
2020 deaths